Frank Mitchell may refer to:
Frank Mitchell (sportsman, born 1872) (1872–1935), English cricketer and rugby union player
Sir Frank Herbert Mitchell (1878–1951), English cricketer and member of the British Royal household, 1920–1931
Frank Mitchell (goalkeeper) (1890–1958), Scottish football goalkeeper (Liverpool, Everton, Motherwell)
Frank Mitchell (actor) (1905–1991), American actor
George Francis Mitchell (1912–1997), known as Frank, Irish geologist and naturalist

Frank Mitchell (sportsman, born 1922) (1922–1984), Australian-born association footballer and county cricketer
Frank Mitchell (politician) (born 1925), politician in British Columbia, Canada
Frank Mitchell (musician) (c. 1945–c. 1971), American jazz saxophonist
Frank Mitchell (prisoner) (c. 1929–1966), English criminal known as "The Mad Axeman" and associate of the Kray twins
Frank Mitchell (presenter) (born 1960), Northern Irish TV presenter
Frank Mitchell (striker), soccer player
Frank N. Mitchell (1921–1950), US Marine and Medal of Honor recipient
W. Franklin Mitchell, American politician
Frank Mitchell (bowls) (born 1911), South African lawn bowler
 F. W. D. Mitchell (1845–1936), Australian civil servant and health writer

See also
Franklin Mitchell (disambiguation)
Francis Mitchell (disambiguation)